Kasam is a 2001 Indian Bollywood action film directed by Shibu Mitra, starring Sunny Deol, Naseeruddin Shah, Chunky Pandey, Neelam Kothari and Sonu Walia in pivotal roles. This film released in Bangladesh as Bengali Dubbed  "Phool Aar Pathar" with changing supporting cast. This film in Bangladesh was declared "HIT".

Plot
In aid of seeking revenge for his dad's death, against a bandit called Kala Daku, Shankar team up with two men, a police inspector, Mangal and a run away convict, Vijay. Shankar makes his living by driving a truck while Vijay and Mangal masquerade as villagers to surface as saviors to protect the village against Kala's gang. And then Kala and his men abduct Vijay; now Mangal and the entire police force will have to negotiate with Kala to let Vijay off in exchange for the landlord's son.

Cast
 Sunny Deol as Shankar
 Naseeruddin Shah as Mangal Singh
 Chunky Pandey as Vijay
 Neelam as Bindiya
 Sonu Walia as Bijli
 Hemant Birje as Police Inspector
 Ranjeet as Hari Singh
 Sharat Saxena as Vikram
 Sadashiv Amrapurkar as Kala Daku
 Parikshat Sahni as Thakur Jaswant Singh
 Anjana Mumtaz as Mrs. Jaswant Singh
 Ahmed Sharif as Thakur Sahab
 Bob Christo as John
Adil Hossain as Bangladeshi version of Ranjit Role
Sheikh Abul Kashem Mithun Sunney Deol Elder Brother in Bangladeshi Version 

Rebeka

Soundtrack

References

External links

2000s Hindi-language films
2001 films
Films scored by Jatin–Lalit
Films scored by Viju Shah
Indian action drama films